Mountain View is a hamlet in Alberta, Canada within Cardston County. It is also a kickoff point for visitors to Police Outpost Provincial Park, 18 kilometers to the south.

The hamlet is located in Census Division No. 3 and in the federal riding of Medicine Hat—Cardston—Warner. It is administered by Cardston County. It was originally named Fish Creek and named Mountain View in 1893.

Demographics 

See also 
List of communities in Alberta
List of designated places in Alberta
List of former urban municipalities in Alberta
List of hamlets in Alberta

References 

Cardston County
Hamlets in Alberta
Former villages in Alberta
Designated places in Alberta
Latter-day Saint settlements in Canada